Jeff Yang (born ) is an American writer, journalist, businessman, and business/media consultant who writes the Tao Jones column for The Wall Street Journal. Previously, he was the "Asian Pop" columnist at the San Francisco Chronicle.

Education 
Yang graduated from Harvard University in 1989 with a Bachelor of Arts in psychology.

Career 
Yang has written the books, Once Upon a Time in China: A Guide to the Cinemas of Hong Kong, Taiwan and Mainland China, I Am Jackie Chan: My Life in Action (with Jackie Chan), Eastern Standard Time: A Guide to Asian Influence in American Culture, from Astro Boy to Zen Buddhism, and Secret Identities: The Asian American Superhero Anthology. He recently co-wrote the second graphic novel in the Secret Identities series, Shattered: The Asian American Comics Anthology. In addition, he has written for the Village Voice, VIBE, Spin, and Condé Nast Portfolio.

Yang is also a business/media consultant on marketing to Asian American consumers for Iconoculture, Inc. Before joining Iconoculture, Yang was CEO of Factor, Inc., another marketing consultancy targeting Asian Americans. From 1989 until 2002, when it went out of business, Yang was publisher of A Magazine, then the largest circulating English-language Asian American magazine in the United States. The magazine grew out of an undergraduate publication that he had edited while a student at Harvard University. Yang was a producer for the first nationally distributed Asian American television show, Stir.

He is a member of the Asian American Journalists Association and has served on the advisory boards of the Asian American Justice Center, Asian Americans Advancing Justice, and the China Institute in America.

In March of 2022, Yang jointly authored and released RISE: A Pop History of Asian America from the Nineties to Now with Philip Wang and Phil Yu.

Personal life 
Yang was married to Heather Ying, a physician assistant in cardiothoracic surgery. They divorced in 2013. They have two sons, Hudson and Skyler. Their elder son, Hudson Yang, is a star of the 2015 ABC television series Fresh Off the Boat, based on Eddie Huang's memoir, Fresh Off the Boat: A Memoir.

See also 
 Chinese people in New York City
 New Yorkers in journalism
 Taiwanese people in New York City

References

External links 
 Asian American Justice Center bio
 Asian Pop column archive, San Francisco Chronicle
 INSTANT YANG, Jeff Yang's mailing list
 Random House co-author bio for I am Jackie Chan
 Wedding vows: Heather Ying & Jeff Yang, The New York Times, Aug. 25, 2002
 Secret Identities Official Web site

1960s births
Living people
American consultants
American consulting businesspeople
American male journalists
American writers of Taiwanese descent
American journalists of Chinese descent
American marketing businesspeople
Place of birth missing (living people)
Television producers from New York City
American writers of Chinese descent
Businesspeople from New York City
Harvard College alumni
The Wall Street Journal people
Writers from New York City
American chief executives